Cama Incendiada (Burned Bed) is the ninth studio album released by Maná on April 21, 2015.

Track listing

Charts

Weekly charts

Year-end charts

Certifications

See also
List of number-one Billboard Latin Albums from the 2010s
List of number-one albums of 2015 (Spain)

References

Album chart usages for Spain
2015 albums
Maná albums
Pop rock albums by Mexican artists
Spanish-language albums
Latin Grammy Award for Best Pop/Rock Album